Khoon Ka Khoon also called Hamlet is the first Hindi/Urdu  1935 sound film  adaptation of the Shakespearen play Hamlet. Directed by Sohrab Modi under his Stage Film Company banner, it is cited as one of the earliest talkie versions of this play. Credited as "the man who brought Shakespeare to the Indian screen", it was Modi's debut feature film as a director. The story and script were by Mehdi Hassan Ahsan from his Urdu adaptation of Shakespeare's "Hamlet". Starring Sohrab Modi, Khoon Ka Khoon was also the debut in films of Naseem Banu who played Ophelia. The other star cast included Shamshadbai, Ghulam Hussain, Obali Mai, Fazal Karim and Eruch Tarapore.

Khoon Ka Khoon was a "filmed version of a stage performance of the play" with Sohrab Modi as Hamlet and Naseem Banu as Ophelia. The film has been cited by National Film Archive of India founder P K. Nair, as one of "21 most wanted missing Indian cinema treasures".

Plot
The film stays close to the play, with Hamlet's dead father wanting Hamlet to punish the people responsible for his death. Hamlet, unwilling to believe his mother's involvement is in a quandary and pretends to be insane. He has a play staged denouncing his mother and uncle. Gertrude drinks the poison intended for Hamlet, Hamlet kills his step-father and succumbs to the wounds received.

Cast
 Sohrab Modi as Hamlet
 Naseem Banu as Ophelia
 Shamshadbai as Gertrude
 Ghulam Hussain
 Obali Mai
 Fazal Karim
 Eruch Tarapore
 Ghulam Mohiyuddin
 Shamshad
 Rampiary
 Gauhar
 B. Pawar

Production
As reported by Peter Morris, Khoon Ka Khoon was a "recording of a stage production", Modi filmed it using two cameras as the play was being staged. The play was a mix of Elizabethan costumes for the main leads, with a mixture of Western stage and Indian costumes for other characters in the play. Modi decided to film the play shot by shot as in the staging of the play. Mehdi Ahsan, a known writer of the Parsi theatre had earlier adapted the play for the silent film Khoon-e-Nahak (1928), before staging it for Modi. He apparently stated that he had to alter the Shakesperean plays to suit the Indian audience's "way of thinking".

Director Modi asked Shamshadbai, Naseem Banu's mother, to play to play the role of Gertrude (Hamlet's mother), in order to take the pressure off the young Naseem during shooting.

Box office and reception
Khoon Ka Khoon, which was the first sound version of a Shakespeare play was not a success at the box office. However, Modi's film was appreciated mainly for the Urdu dialogues, the "quality of the play" and his acting. Modi's acting was noted as a performance dominating the film.

Soundtrack
The music was provided by Kanhaiya Parwar with lyrics by Mehndi Hassan Ahmed.

Song list

References

External links

Images for Khoon Ka Khoon

1935 films
1930s Hindi-language films
Films based on Hamlet
Films directed by Sohrab Modi
Indian black-and-white films
Indian drama films
1935 drama films
Hindi-language drama films
Indian films based on plays